Leptodrassus is a genus of ground spiders that was first described by Eugène Simon in 1878.

Species
 it contains eleven species:
Leptodrassus albidus Simon, 1914 – Azores, Canary Is., Spain to Greece (Crete), Turkey, Israel
Leptodrassus bergensis Tucker, 1923 – South Africa
Leptodrassus croaticus Dalmas, 1919 – Croatia
Leptodrassus diomedeus Caporiacco, 1951 – Italy
Leptodrassus femineus (Simon, 1873) (type) – Portugal to Crete, Israel
Leptodrassus fragilis Dalmas, 1919 – Algeria, Libya
Leptodrassus incertus Banks, 1898 – Mexico
Leptodrassus licentiosus Dalmas, 1919 – South Africa
Leptodrassus punicus Dalmas, 1919 – Tunisia
Leptodrassus strandi Caporiacco, 1947 – Ethiopia
Leptodrassus tropicus Dalmas, 1919 – Sierra Leone

References

Araneomorphae genera
Gnaphosidae
Spiders of Africa
Spiders of Asia
Spiders of Mexico
Taxa named by Eugène Simon